The 1999–2000 season was Galatasaray's 96th in existence and the 42nd consecutive season in the 1. Lig. This article shows statistics of the club's players in the season, and also lists all matches that the club have played in the season.
Galatasaray completed a treble of the 1.Lig, Turkish Cup and UEFA Cup.

Club

Board of Directors

Elected as of 25 March 2000

Facilities

Squad statistics

Players in / out

In

Out

1. Lig

Standings

Matches

Türkiye Kupası
Kick-off listed in local time (EET)

Third round

Fourth round

Quarter-final

Semi-final

Final

UEFA Champions League

Third qualifying round

Group stage

UEFA Cup

Third round

Fourth round

Quarter-final

Semi-final

Final

Friendlies

TSYD Kupası

Attendance

References

Galatasaray S.K. (football) seasons
Galatasaray S.K.
UEFA Europa League-winning seasons
Turkish football championship-winning seasons
1990s in Istanbul
2000s in Istanbul
Galatasaray Sports Club 1999–2000 season